Air Chief Marshal Jamal Ahmad Khan Afridi  (b. 15 April 1934) is a retired four-star air officer who served as the Chief of Air Staff of the Pakistan Air Force from 1985 until 1988. He also commanded the United Arab Emirates Air Force from 1977 until 1980.

Biography

Jamal Ahmad Khan was born in Kaimganj, Farrukhabad district in India, on 15 April 1934.

In 1952, after the partition of India, he joined the Pakistan Air Force (PAF). He was sent to attend the Pakistan Air Force Academy in Risalpur, and was one of the few cadets who were selected to attend the United States Air Force Academy in Colorado, United States. Upon completing the pilot training program from the USAF Academy in 1953, Jamal was commissioned in the No. 11 Squadron Arrows, initially trained to fly the British Supermarine Attacker. He was further trained in the United States as a test pilot, eventually qualified to fly the Lockheed F-104 Starfighter.

This was recorded as the first kill achieved by an F-104 at night after a number of near misses.

In 1971, Wing-Commander Jamal continued flying his F-104 on the western front of the third war with India. Wg-Cdr. Jamal shot down another Canberra with an AIM-9B missile; the Canberra pilot perished.

After the war, Group Captain Jamal was posted to a Command Operations Center at the Air Headquarters (AHQ) in Islamabad until appointed as base commander of the Sargodha Air Force Base. In 1975, Air Commodore Jamal joined the JAG Corps, Air Force, appointed its chief inspector and later judge advocate general. For some time, Air Cdre. Jamal served as the ACAS (Plans) at the AHQ before being promoted to the two-star rank, Air vice-marshal (AVM).

In 1977, AVM Jamal was posted as an AOC at the Pakistan Armed Forces–Middle East Command, and seconded to command the United Arab Emirates Air Force until 1980. During this time, AVM Jamal took over the command of the Pakistan Armed Forces–Middle East Command, serving as its commander until 1980. Upon returning, AVM Jamal flew the MiG-19 and MiG-21 for test trial purposes. During this time, he went to the United States to complete his training to fly the F-16A. He was the first Pakistani to fly the F-16A in the United States, and later returned to Pakistan.

In 1982–83, Air-Marshal Jamal was appointed as DCAS (Air Operations), and later appointed as Vice Chief of the Air Staff in 1984.

In 1985, Air-Mshl. Jamal was promoted to four-star rank, Air Chief Marshal (ACM), and took over command of the Pakistan Air Force as its Chief of Air Staff. In 1987, ACM Jamal launched the project to develop and design a fighter jet, with Grumman Aerospace as its consultant. After completing his tenure, ACM Jamal was succeeded by ACM H.K. Durrani on 6 March 1988. After his retirement, he settled in Islamabad, and worked as an aviation historian, contributing to the book on aerial aviation, The Story of the Pakistan Air Force, 1988-1998: A Battle Against Odds.

Awards & Decorations

See also
F-104 in the service of Pakistan Air Force

References

External links
PAF s' Chief of Air Staffs

|-
 

1934 births
People from Farrukhabad district
Muhajir people
Pakistani expatriates in the United States
United States Air Force Academy alumni
Pakistan Air Force officers
Pakistani test pilots
Pilots of the Indo-Pakistani War of 1965
Pakistani flying aces
Pakistani military personnel of the Indo-Pakistani War of 1971
Pilots of the Indo-Pakistani War of 1971
Chiefs of Air Staff (United Arab Emirates)
Pakistan Air Force air marshals
Chiefs of Air Staff, Pakistan
Military government of Pakistan (1977–1988)
Recipients of Sitara-e-Jurat
Recipients of Nishan-e-Imtiaz
Pakistani military historians
Living people
Pakistani expatriates in the United Arab Emirates